Malcolm Barcola (born 14 May 1999) is a professional footballer who plays as a goalkeeper for Bosnian Premier League club Tuzla City. Born in France, he plays for the Togo national team.

International career
Barcola made his Togo national team on 10 September 2019 in the second leg of the first round of 2022 World Cup qualification against the Comoros. He kept a clean sheet as his country advanced to the next round.

Personal life 
Barcola's brother Bradley is also a professional footballer with Lyon.

References

External links
 
 

1999 births
Living people
Footballers from Lyon
Citizens of Togo through descent
Togolese footballers
Togo international footballers
French footballers
French sportspeople of Togolese descent
Association football goalkeepers
Olympique Lyonnais players
Championnat National 2 players
FK Tuzla City players
Togolese expatriate footballers
Expatriate footballers in Bosnia and Herzegovina
Togolese expatriate sportspeople in Bosnia and Herzegovina